Verna Reed Coutts (13 July 1930 – 31 January 2010) was a New Zealand cricketer who played as a right-handed batter. She appeared in six Test matches for New Zealand between 1954 and 1957. She played domestic cricket for Wellington and Canterbury.

References

External links
 
 

1930 births
2010 deaths
People from Inglewood, New Zealand
New Zealand women cricketers
New Zealand women Test cricketers
Wellington Blaze cricketers
Canterbury Magicians cricketers